Aimee Friedman (born 1979) is the author of several young adult novels published by Scholastic Inc., Point and S&S.  Her novels South Beach (2004) (a New York Times bestseller), French Kiss (2005), Hollywood Hills (2007) and The Year My Sister Got Lucky (2008) focus on the scandalous adventures of on-again, off-again best friends Holly Jacobson and Alexa St. Laurent. Friedman released Sea Change on June 1, 2009. A Novel Idea (2005) is a romantic comedy about a teenager who starts a book club in Park Slope, Brooklyn. Friedman wrote one of the four stories in the holiday collection Mistletoe (2006), which also features stories by Nina Malkin, Hailey Abbott, and Melissa de la Cruz. Friedman wrote a short story, "Three Fates" for the book 21 Proms. In 2007, Friedman published, along with artist Christine Norrie, a graphic novel entitled Breaking Up which details the complicated dynamics of junior year in an arts school in New York. In 2016, she published Two Summers.

Friedman grew up in Queens, New York, attended Bronx High School of Science, and graduated Phi Beta Kappa in 2001 with a BA in English from Vassar College.  She resides in Manhattan. She went to a dance school with her older sister.

Bibliography

Books By Aimee Friedman
 South Beach (2004)
French Kiss (2005)
A Novel Idea (2005)
Hollywood Hills (2007)
The Year My Sister Got Lucky (2008)
Sea Change (2009)
Two Summers (2016)

Contributor
Mistletoe (2006)
21 Proms

Graphic novel
Breaking Up (2007 - with Christine Norrie )

As Ruth Ames
This Totally Bites - Poison Apple Book 2 (2009)
At First Bite - Poison Apple Book 8 (2011)

References

External links
Aimee Friedman's Website
Aimee Friedman Author Profile at Scholastic
Aimee Friedman Author Profile at Point Press
Aimee Friedman Author interview at BookReviewsAndMore.ca

1979 births
Living people
21st-century American novelists
American women novelists
People from Queens, New York
Vassar College alumni
21st-century American women writers
Novelists from New York (state)